The Successful Pyrate is a play by Charles Johnson, first performed 1712, published 1713, dealing with the life of the pirate Henry Avery. It opened at the Theatre Royal, Drury Lane on 7 November 1712 and ran for five evenings. The original cast included Barton Booth as Arviragus, Robert Wilks as Aranes, John Mills as Boreal, Theophilus Keene as De Sale, William Pinkethman as Sir Gaudy Tulip, Henry Norris as Chicane, John Leigh as Jollyboy, William Bullock as Judge Bull, Christopher Bullock as Serjeant Dolt and Mary Porter as Zaida.

Plot
In the play, Avery goes under the name Arviragus, and has made himself a king in Madagascar. He captures the Indian princess Zaida and tries to force her to marry him, but she is in love with a young man named Aranes. There is an offstage fight and Aranes is reported killed; meanwhile, De Sale, who has confided to the audience that he plots to overthrow Arviragus and make himself king, ingratiates himself with Zaida.

De Sale's fellow plotters are bumbling incompetents and their plans are easily thwarted, followed by a comic trial scene. It is revealed that Aranes is Arviragus' long lost son, whom he recognizes from a bracelet, and that he is still alive, his friend Alvarez having died in his place. The plotters are executed and Aranes and Zaida marry.

Characters
 Arviragus, king of the island of St. Laurence, or Madagascar
 Aranes, an Omrah in Zaida's train
 Boreal, admiral to Arviragus
 De Sale, lieutenant to Arviragus
 Richardo, captain of the guards
 Piracquo, De Sale's creature
 Sir Gaudy Tulip, master of the ceremonies
 Chicane, a broken lawyer
 Jollyboy, treasurer to Arviragus
 Judge Bull
 Serjeant Dolt
 Counsellor Smooth
 Herring
 Porpoise
 Shark
 Codshead
 Zaida, Aurengzebe's granddaughter, contracted to and in love with Aranes
 Samanthe, her chief attendant
 Lydia, Piracquo's wife
 Lesbia, Tulip's wife

Dramatic analysis
The Successful Pyrate is a romanticised dramatisation of two episodes contained in a pamphlet that had been recently published concerning the career of the pirate Henry Avery: his capture of the Mogul Aurengzeb's ship Gang-i-sawai, allegedly carrying the Mogul's granddaughter; and a plot against him by his lieutenant De Sale and other pirates.

The play is primarily a comedy. The pirates are mostly fools, in particular Sir Gaudy Tulip, an aged and cowardly London beau; the Gang-i-sawai is, for no reason other than comic effect, carrying two European ladies, Tulip's ex-mistress and another pirate's ex-wife, who exchange tart comments with the men; the drunken conspirators and outrageously partial court are played entirely for laughs.

Reception
John Dennis condemned the play for "encouraging Villany".

References

External links
 

1712 plays
West End plays
Piracy in fiction
Plays set in the 18th century
Plays by Charles Johnson